Agustín Miguel Alonso Raya (born 28 August 1954) is a Mexican politician affiliated with the PRD. As of 2013 he served as Deputy of both the LIX and LXII Legislatures of the Mexican Congress representing Guanajuato.

References

1954 births
Living people
Politicians from Guanajuato
Members of the Chamber of Deputies (Mexico) for Guanajuato
Party of the Democratic Revolution politicians
People from Salvatierra, Guanajuato
21st-century Mexican politicians
Universidad Iberoamericana alumni
20th-century Mexican politicians
Deputies of the LIII Legislature of Mexico
Deputies of the LVII Legislature of Mexico
Deputies of the LIX Legislature of Mexico
Deputies of the LXII Legislature of Mexico